Arthur Keppel-Jones (1909–1996) was a South African and Canadian historian and science fiction writer. He was a senior lecturer at the University of the Witwatersrand until he emigrated to Canada.

Selected works

References

1909 births
1996 deaths
South African emigrants to Canada
Academic staff of the University of the Witwatersrand
20th-century South African historians
South African science fiction writers